In Gallo-Roman religion, Loucetios (Latinized as Leucetius) was a Gallic god known from the Rhine-Moselle region, where he was identified with the Roman Mars. Scholars have interpreted his name to mean ‘lightning’. Mars Loucetius was worshipped alongside the goddess Nemetona.

Name and etymology
The name Loucetios derives from a Celtic stem *lowk-et-, meaning 'flash of lightning, thunderbolt' (cf. Old Irich lóchet), itself from the root *lowk- ('bright, light'; cf. Middle Irish luach 'glowing light', Middle Welsh llug 'eyesight, perception'). It is the source of the place name Luzech, attested as Luzechium in 1326 CE.

The name may be a reference to either a Celtic common metaphor for battles as thunderstorms (cf. Old Irish torannchless, the 'thunder feat'), or else the divine aura of the hero (the lúan of Cú Chulainn). It is presumably analogous to Oscan Loucetius ‘light-bringer’, an epithet of Jupiter.

Inscriptions and shrines
About a dozen inscriptions in honour of Mars Loucetius have been recovered, mainly from eastern Gaul, with a particular concentration among the Vangiones and Aresaces (two Rhenish tribes). Inscriptions to him have also been found at Bath and Angers; the altar at Bath specifies that it was dedicated by a citizen of the Treveri.

Inscriptions often invoke Mars Loucetius together with Victoria or Nemetona (or both, in the case of the Eisenberg inscription). Edith Mary Wightman considers this pair “closely similar to if not identical with, Lenus and Ancamna”, who are known chiefly from the territory of the Treveri adjacent to those of the Aresaces and Vangiones.

Four of the inscriptions to Mars Loucetius are also dedicated IN H(onorem) D(omūs) D(ivinae), ‘in honour of the divine house’ (i.e. the imperial family).

Wightman further suggests that the shrine of Mars Loucetius at Klein-Winternheim, south of Mainz, was “a central one for the Aresaces”, the ancient inhabitants of the Mainz-Bingen area.

==Modern literature==

In Neil Gaiman's American Gods, Leucotios appears in chapter three, during Shadow's (the main character) dream of forgotten gods. Gaiman's Leucotios is described as a “man with ... white hair, with a necklace of teeth about his neck, holding a drum”.

References

Bibliography

Gaulish gods
Thunder gods
Martian deities